Valentin Mikhaylov (born 5 December 1929) is a Soviet cyclist. He competed in the 4,000 metres team pursuit event at the 1952 Summer Olympics.

References

External links
  

1929 births
Possibly living people
Soviet male cyclists
Olympic cyclists of the Soviet Union
Cyclists at the 1952 Summer Olympics
Cyclists from Moscow